(December 6, 1959 – July 3, 2016) was a Japanese guitarist who led the band ZABADAK. He also composed the original music for the 1988 cult horror film Evil Dead Trap, and performed guitar on soundtracks of the role-playing video games Xenogears (1998) and Chrono Cross (1999), playing the opening and ending themes on the latter. He later recorded an album with the singer of the ending theme from Chrono Cross, Noriko Mitose.

His hobbies included collecting insects and the outdoors. He owned a collection of butterflies and beetles. 

He died on July 3, 2016, 3 months after playing at a 30th anniversary concert.

References

External links
 
 

1959 births
2016 deaths
Japanese guitarists